The Casati Stampa murders refer to the 1970 murders, in Rome, Italy, committed by Camillo II Casati Stampa di Soncino, marquess of Casate, of his wife Anna Fallarino and her lover Massimo Minorenti, followed by the suicide of the murderer, a crime that, at the time, "shocked Italy."

Background
Casati Stampa, born in 1927, was descendant of one of the oldest Milanese families of  Italian nobility, which had risen to prominence since the 15th century. His father was for a time married to heiress and patroness of the arts Luisa Adele Rosa Maria Amman. Stampa married young actress Letizia Izzo and they had a daughter, the marquise Annamaria. Anna Fallarino, born in 1929, grew up in Amorosi of the Benevento province in Campania. At the age of 12, as her niece Mariateresa Fiumanò later revealed in a book, Fallarino was sexually abused by the local parish-priest. Fallarino tried for a career in cinema, making only a short appearance in the comedy Totò Tarzan. She married engineer Giuseppe "Peppino" Drommi and they had no children.

In 1955, Stampa and Fallarino first met, by some accounts in Cannes, or by others in an event at the Palazzo Barberini, in Rome. They became lovers and, after succeeding in the annulment of their respective marriages by the Tribunale della Rota Romana (the Apostolic Tribunal of the Roman Rota), the highest appellate tribunal of the Catholic Church, they got married in a civil ceremony in 1959, and, in 1961, in a religious one.

From the early days of their marriage, Casati Stampa was inviting men to have sex with his wife while he was watching and often taking pictures, while he also kept a diary of these events. The couple, during summertime, were mostly staying in the "rugged" island of Zannone, located off the coast between Rome and Naples, in a villa situated on the summit of the island, in which they were throwing nightly "wild parties" that involved "heavy drinking" and group sex and lasted until  morning.

The crime
Among the men who were sexual partners of Casati Stampa's wife was Massimo Minorenti, a young Italian involved in far-right circles who, after briefly appearing in porn films, worked as an escort of "older rich women." Fallarino started seeing Minorenti without her husband being present and Casati Stampa, learning of this, became jealous. On 30 August 1970, he stormed in a "distraught" condition their home on Via Puccini 9 and asked the servants not to disturb him. He entered the living room where his wife and Minorenti were sitting waiting for him and fired three shots with his 12-gauge Browning at Fallarino who was killed instantly and then two shots at Minorenti who had tried in vain to protect himself behind a small table. He then turned the weapon on his head and fired. The servants, upon hearing the shots, called the police.

Aftermath
The marquess' will had bequeathed everything to his wife. Following their deaths, a legal battled began between the two respective families for the inheritance. The autopsy having determined that Fallarino had expired before her husband, the fortune of Camillo II Casati Stampa of more than 2.4 billion lire (at the time worth about $3.9mln and in 2020 about $26mln) was awarded to his heir, daughter Annamaria from his wedding to Letizia Izzo. Among the fortune's assets was the Villa San Martino, in Arcore, which Annamaria sold to Silvio Berlusconi in 1972.

More than a thousand photographs taken by Casati Stampa, and showing his wife in various settings, found their way into newspapers and magazines some time after the crime.

In 2020, author Maria Pia Selvaggio published her book, Il delitto di via Puccini (The crime of Puccini street), offering a "fictionalized" account of the crime. The same year, director Umberto Rinaldi  announced the production of a film based on the book.

In July 2020, organizers of tours to crime scenes in Rome started including visits to the address where the Casati Stampa murders were committed.

On Zannone, by the 2020s, there are no buildings except for the lighthouse and the deserted villa. The island is inhabited only by mouflon wild sheep, now a protected species.

Notes

References

Further reading
Uxoricide
Compersion
Murder–suicide
Voyeurism
Sexual jealousy

External links

1970 murders in Italy
Murder–suicides in Italy
Female murder victims
Incidents of violence against women
Violence against women in Italy
Noble families
Italian nobility
Italian noble families
Murder in Rome